Anthropology of Christianity may refer to:

Two fields within anthropology
 Anthropology of religion
 Comparative religion

A field within theology
Christian anthropology